Asaveleh or Asavleh may refer to:
 Asaveleh, Kamyaran
 Asavleh, Sanandaj